The 2014–15 Red Stripe Premier League is the highest competitive football league in Jamaica. It is the 41st edition of the competition. It started on September 7, 2014 and ended on June 1, 2015.

Changes from 2013–14 

 Barbican and Reno were promoted from the Jamaican second levels 
 August Town and Portmore United were relegated to the Jamaican second levels

Teams

League table

Playoffs
First Legs

Second Legs

Final

Top goalscorers

References

External links 
 jamaicafootballfederation.com

National Premier League seasons
1
Jam